The Cort van der Linden cabinet was the cabinet of the Netherlands from 29 August 1913 until 9 September 1918. The cabinet was formed by Independent Liberal Pieter Cort van der Linden after the election of 1913 and received confidence and supply in the House of Representatives from other Independent Liberals and several members of the Free-thinking Democratic League (VDB), Christian Historical Union (CHU) and the Liberal Union (LU) and from 15 December 1917 also the Economic League (EL). The centre cabinet was officially a minority government in the House of Representatives but was also supported by additional members of the Anti-Revolutionary Party (ARP) for a majority. It was the last cabinet with a Liberal Prime Minister until Mark Rutte became Prime Minister 92 years later on 14 October 2010.

Cabinet Members

 Resigned.
 Served ad interim.
 Medical leave of absence.

References

External links
Official

  Kabinet-Cort van der Linden Parlement & Politiek

Cabinets of the Netherlands
1913 establishments in the Netherlands
1918 disestablishments in the Netherlands
Cabinets established in 1913
Cabinets disestablished in 1918
Minority governments